Snider Creek is a stream in the U.S. state of Oregon. It is a tributary to Rogue River.

The name "Snider Creek" was assigned in 1937 by United States Forest Service officials.

References

Rivers of Oregon
Rivers of Jackson County, Oregon